Seti Kiole (born 7 June 1980 in Holopeka, Tonga) is a Tongan rugby union footballer. His father, Peni Kiole, was a Tongan International. He is a cousin of Jonah Lomu. His position is winger. He is a cousin of NRL player John Tamanika.

Kiole plays for the ASM Clermont Auvergne in the French Top 14 league and previously played for Gloucester Rugby. He also plays for the Tonga national team. He represented his country in the 2007 Rugby World Cup. He weighs .

Notes

External links
IRB Player Profile

1980 births
Living people
Rugby union wings
Tongan rugby union players
Tonga international rugby union players
Tongan expatriate rugby union players
Expatriate rugby union players in France
Expatriate rugby union players in England
Tongan expatriate sportspeople in France
Tongan expatriate sportspeople in England
People from Haʻapai